Steven Joel Takiff is an American mathematician who introduced what became Takiff algebras in 1971.

Publications

References

External links
Doctoral graduates from 1903-present, Department of Mathematics, University of Illinois at Urbana-Champaign

LinkedIn account

Living people
20th-century American mathematicians
21st-century American mathematicians
University of Illinois Urbana-Champaign alumni
Michigan State University faculty
Algebraists
People from Illinois
People from Michigan
People from Dayton, Ohio
Year of birth missing (living people)